The Diocese of Central Newfoundland is part of the Anglican Church of Canada and was brought about by The Restructuring of the Diocese of Newfoundland Act, 1975. The Diocese of Eastern Newfoundland and Labrador and the Diocese of Western Newfoundland were also part of the restructuring of the previous Diocese of Newfoundland into three dioceses.  Based on the last available information in 2012 the diocese has an Anglican population of 33,000 souls in 32 parishes, with 32 priests in parish ministry, 330 Licensed Lay-Ministers and 430 Eucharistic Assistants.

Bishops
Mark Genge, 1976–1990
Edward Frank "Eddie" Marsh, 1990–2000
Donald A. "Don" Young, 2001–2004
(Frederick) David Torraville (2005–2016)
John Edwin Watton (2016–present)

References

External links
Diocese of Central Newfoundland official site
Anglican Church of Canada official site

Central Newfoundland, Diocese of
 
Anglican Province of Canada